The article contains information about the 2021–22 Iran 3rd Division football season. This is the 4th rated football league in Iran after the Persian Gulf Cup, Azadegan League, and 2nd Division. The league will start on 14 November 2021.

In total 85 teams (65 teams in the first stage in 5 groups, 20 teams in second stage) competed in this season's competitions.

First stage
The top 2 teams from each group advance to the Second Stage. The teams ranked 3rd, 4th and 5th in each group (total 15 teams) are eligible to play in the First Round of next season. The teams ranked 6th and lower relegate to Provincial Leagues.

Qualified teams
Teams which are eligible to play in this round are as follows:

Relegated from 3rd Division – 2nd Stage (10 Teams):

Remaining from 3rd Division – 1st Stage (15 Teams):

Promoted from Provincial Leagues (34 Teams):

Free slots (6 teams):

Group A

Group B

Group C

Group D

Group E

Second stage

In this stage, 10 teams who qualified from 1st stage will join to 16 remaining teams from previous season and 4 relegated teams from 2nd division (total 30 teams). Teams will be divided into 3 groups of 10 teams each and play a round-robin home and away matches. The winner of each group will promote to 2nd division and 3 runners-up and the best 3rd placed team will qualify to Play-off stage. The 3 bottom clubs in each group and the worst 7th placed team among groups will relegate to next season's 1st stage.

Qualified teams
Relegated from 2nd Division (4 Teams):

Remaining Teams from last season (16 Teams):

Promoted from 1st Stage (10 Teams):

Group 1

Group 2

Group 3

Ranking of third-placed teams

Ranking of seventh-placed teams 

The worst seventh-placed should relegate to 3rd Division - 1st Stage. But due to direct relegation of Gol Reyhan Alborz from 2nd division to 3rd Division - 1st Stage (instead of 3rd Division - 2nd Stage), they remained in 3rd Division - 2nd Stage and not relegated.

Play-offs
The draw of the play-off round held on July 11 2022, between following teams:

Qualified teams
2nd placed teams in Second Stage (3 teams):
 KIA Tehran
 Benyamin Varzesh Tehran
 Sepahan Novin Isfahan
Best 3rd placed team in Second Stage (1 team):
 Damash Gilan

First round

Benyamin Varzesh Tehran won 5-3 on penalties and promoted to second play-off round.

Damash Gilan won 2-1 on aggregate and promoted to second play-off round.

Second round

Damash Gilan won 4-1 on aggregate and promoted to 2022-23 Iran Football's 2nd Division.

References 

League 3 (Iran) seasons